Kappers is a surname and may refer to:

 C. U. Ariëns Kappers (1877-1946), Dutch neurologist
 Ariëns Kappers Medal, a scientific honor named after the Dutch neurologist Cornelius Ubbo Ariëns Kappers
 Marnix Kappers (1943–2016), Dutch cabaret artist and actor

See also
 Siegfried Kapper (1821–1879), literary pseudonym of Bohemian-born Austrian writer Isaac Salomon Kapper